Nedanice is a village and administrative part of Měčín in Klatovy District in the Plzeň Region of the Czech Republic. It has about 60 inhabitants.

History
The first written mention of Nedanice is from 1368.

Transport
It is located on the road of second category II/117.

Gallery

References

Neighbourhoods in the Czech Republic
Populated places in Klatovy District